DN Tower 21 is an office building in Tokyo, Japan. It includes the former Dai-Ichi Seimei Building, in which Douglas MacArthur had his headquarters during the occupation of Japan following World War II. The Government of Tokyo designated DN Tower 21 as a historical building in 2004.

The shorter five-story building, the former headquarters of SCAP, was completed in 1933 (renovated 1989–1995) for the headquarters of the Norinchukin Bank, and the Dai-Ichi Seimei began to house its offices in the building in 1938. The shorter building was designed by the Japanese architect Yoshikazu Uchida. The taller 21-storey building (at 99.8 metres in height) began construction in 1988 and was completed in 1993, and was designed by the Irish-American architect Kevin Roche. Shimizu Corporation was contracted to construct both buildings.

The building still serves as headquarters for both the Norinchukin Bank and Dai-ichi Life.

Notes

External links
Government of Tokyo site

 

Buildings and structures in Chiyoda, Tokyo
Shimizu Corporation
Dai-ichi Life
Office buildings completed in 1933